Henry Hulse Berens (1804 – 23 August 1883) was an English first-class cricketer and official of the Hudson's Bay Company (HBC).

The son of Joseph Berens Junior, he was born in Kevington, Kent. Several members of his family served on the committee of the HBC: his great-grandfather Herman Berens, his grandfather Joseph Berens, his father and later Berens himself. He married Elinor Stone in 1842.

He was active as a cricketer from 1837 to 1838 and played for Gentlemen of Kent. He appeared in two first-class matches. His brother Richard also played for Gentlemen of Kent.

Berens became a member of the Committee of the HBC in 1833 and became deputy Governor in 1856. He was Governor of the Hudson's Bay Company from 1858 to 1863. He served as a director of the Bank of England from 1849 to 1880.

Berens died in Sidcup.

References 

1804 births
1883 deaths
English cricketers
Gentlemen of Kent cricketers
Governors of the Hudson's Bay Company